Leonid Petrovich Moiseyev (born 1948 in Vladivostok) is a Russian diplomat.

Educated at the Moscow Institute of International Relations, Moiseyev has been a member of first the Soviet and then the Russian diplomatic service since 1973. He has served mainly in the People's Republic of China (he is fluent in Chinese) and Japan.

From 1994 to 2001 Moiseev was first Deputy Director and then Director of the First Asian Directorate of the Ministry of Foreign Affairs of the Russian Federation, dealing with issues relating to China, Taiwan, North Korea, South Korea and Mongolia, and was also a Member of the Collegium of the Ministry of Foreign Affairs of the Russian Federation.

Moiseyev was the Ambassador of Russia to Australia from 20 July 2001 to 10 November 2005, and the ambassador to Singapore between 2011 and 2015.

References

External links
Ambassador Moiseev's speech to the Royal United Services Institute of South Australia on Russia's security outlook, March 2004
Speech by Ambassador Moiseev at the grave of Alexey Dmitrievich Putiata, First Russian Imperial Consul to Melbourne

1948 births
Living people
People from Vladivostok
Moscow State Institute of International Relations alumni
Ambassador Extraordinary and Plenipotentiary (Russian Federation)
Ambassadors of Russia to Australia
Ambassadors of Russia to Nauru
Ambassadors of Russia to Fiji
Ambassadors of Russia to Vanuatu
Ambassadors of Russia to Singapore